The 2009 Brașov Challenger was a professional tennis tournament played on outdoor red clay courts. This was the 14th edition of the tournament which was part of the 2009 ATP Challenger Tour. It took place in Brașov, Romania between 31 August and 6 September 2009.

Singles main draw entrants

Seeds

 Rankings are as of August 24, 2009.

Other entrants
The following players received wildcards into the singles main draw:
  Marius Copil
  Cătălin Gârd
  Andrei Mlendea
  Răzvan Sabău

The following players received entry from the qualifying draw:
  Alexandru Carpen
  Ilie-Aurelian Giurgiu
  Karim Maamoun
  Adrian Ungur

Champions

Singles

 Thiemo de Bakker def.  Pere Riba, 7–5, 6–0

Doubles

 Pere Riba /  Pablo Santos def.  Simone Vagnozzi /  Uros Vico, 6–3, 6–2

References

External links
2009 Brașov Challenger at TenisRomania.ro

Brasov Challenger
BRD Brașov Challenger
2009 in Romanian tennis